Fotis Kipouros (born 9 August 1975) is a Greek former professional footballer who played as a goalkeeper.

Career
Born in Thessaloniki, Kipouros began his playing career by signing with Kavala F.C. in July 1997. In 2010, he signed an annual contract for Greek Football League outfit PAS Giannina. In his first season with the club, he appeared in 26 matches, helping the club to gain promotion to the Superleague. He stayed with PAS Giannina for one more season and appeared in no less than 22 occasions for the club. In the summer of 2013 he signed for newly promoted Superleague club Platanias. He became the club's starting goalkeeper, appearing in all but three matches summing a total of 27 appearances. On 16 July 2013 he signed an annual contract with Iraklis. In the summer of 2014, after his contract with Iraklis expired, he signed for Football League 2 club Kampaniakos.

Honours
AEL
 Greek Cup: 2006–07

References

External links
 Guardian Football
 Profile at Onsports.gr

1975 births
Living people
Greek footballers
Olympiacos Volos F.C. players
Atromitos F.C. players
Panserraikos F.C. players
Athlitiki Enosi Larissa F.C. players
Kavala F.C. players
PAS Giannina F.C. players
Iraklis Thessaloniki F.C. players
Association football goalkeepers
Footballers from Thessaloniki